Raduhovce is a village in the municipality of Tutin, Serbia. At the 2002 census, the village had a population of 402 people.

References

Populated places in Raška District